Neomusotima conspurcatalis is a moth in the family Crambidae. It was described by William Warren in 1896. It is found in India, Indonesia, East Timor and Australia.

The length of the forewings is 4–5 mm.

The larvae feed on Lygodium microphyllum. Young larvae skeletonize the leaves of their host plant, while older larvae consume entire leaves.

References

Musotiminae
Moths of Asia
Moths of Australia
Moths described in 1896
Taxa named by William Warren (entomologist)